Cullen is a former hamlet in Benson Rural Municipality No. 35, Saskatchewan, Canada.

Cullen and the nearby community of Bryant are named after Quaker poet, journalist, and editor William Cullen Bryant.

Demographics

Cullen, like so many other small communities throughout Saskatchewan, has struggled to maintain a sturdy population causing it to become a semi ghost town. At its peak population Cullen had a total of

See also
 List of communities in Saskatchewan
 Hamlets of Saskatchewan

References 

Benson No. 35, Saskatchewan
Unincorporated communities in Saskatchewan
Ghost towns in Saskatchewan
Division No. 1, Saskatchewan